2007 Tokyo Verdy 1969 season

Competitions

Domestic results

J. League 2

Emperor's Cup

Player statistics

Other pages
 J. League official site

Tokyo Verdy 1969
Tokyo Verdy seasons